Bond House, Bonds House, or Bonde House may refer to:

United States

Bonds House (Fox, Arkansas), listed on the NRHP in Arkansas
Lloyd–Bond House, Lloyd, FL, listed on the NRHP in Florida
John R. and Mary Bond House, Carnesville, GA, listed on the NRHP in Georgia
Bond Family House, Lithonia, GA, listed on the NRHP in Georgia
Bond-Baker-Carter House, Royston, GA, listed on the NRHP in Georgia
Bond-Sullivan House, Wichita, KS, listed on the NRHP in Kansas
J. Roy Bond House, Elizabethtown, KY, listed on the NRHP in Kentucky
Jeff Bond House, Red Bush, KY, listed on the NRHP in Kentucky
Bonde Farmhouse, Nerstrand, MN, listed on the NRHP in Minnesota
Bond House (Biloxi, Mississippi), listed on the NRHP in Mississippi
Van Reyper-Bond House, Montclair, NJ, listed on the NRHP in New Jersey
Frank Bond House, Espanola, NM, listed on the NRHP in New Mexico
Col. William M. and Nancy Ralston Bond House, Lockport, NY, listed on the NRHP in New York

See also
Bond (disambiguation)